CBC Film Festival is a Canadian feature film television series which aired on CBC Television from 1979 to 1980.

Premise
Feature films, nearly all Canadian, were featured in this series. In the initial 1979 season, the remainder of the time slot after a film sometimes featured interviews with non-Canadian directors John Cromwell, George Cukor, Samuel Fuller, John Schlesinger, Martin Scorsese, Donald Siegel and John Sturges.

Scheduling
This series appeared in a two-hour time slot, initially on Tuesdays at 9:00 p.m. (Eastern) from 5 June to 8 July 1979, then on Saturdays at 9:00 p.m.from 7 July to 22 September 1979, then a final run in the same time slot the following year, 7 June to 13 September 1980.

Episodes
The Clown Murders
Deadly Harvest
Drying Up the Streets
The Far Shore
The Fighting Men
Goldenrod
Inside Out
J.A. Martin Photographer
Kamouraska
Lies My Father Told Me
Lions for Breakfast
The Little Girl Who Lives Down the Lane
Love at First Sight
One Man
One Night Stand
A Portrait of the Artist as a Young Man (American adaptation by Joseph Strick)
Raku Fire
Second Wind
Skip Tracer
Sudden Fury
Who Has Seen the Wind

References

External links
 

CBC Television original programming
1979 Canadian television series debuts
1980 Canadian television series endings
1970s Canadian variety television series
1980s Canadian variety television series
Canadian motion picture television series